A camoufleur or camouflage officer is a person who designed and implemented military camouflage in one of the world wars of the twentieth century. The term originally meant a person serving in a First World War French military camouflage unit. In the Second World War, the British camouflage officers of the Middle East Command Camouflage Directorate, led by Geoffrey Barkas in the Western Desert, called themselves camoufleurs, and edited a humorous newsletter called The Fortnightly Fluer. Such men were often professional artists. The term is used by extension for all First and Second World War camouflage specialists. Some of these pioneered camouflage techniques. This list is restricted to such notable pioneers of military camouflage.

Surrealist artist Roland Penrose wrote that he and Julian Trevelyan were both "wondering how either of us could be of any use in an occupation so completely foreign to us both as fighting a war, we decided that perhaps our knowledge of painting should find some application in camouflage." Trevelyan later admitted that their early efforts were amateurish. Working in camouflage was not a guarantee of a safe passage through the war. Lucien-Victor Guirand de Scévola's Section de Camouflage, founded in September 1914 in the French army, developed many new techniques, some of them highly dangerous, such as putting up artificial, camouflaged trees at night to replace actual trees with cramped observation posts. The cubist painter André Mare was wounded while preparing one such observation tree. Fifteen of his camoufleur colleagues were killed during the First World War.

Some camoufleurs such as Solomon J. Solomon, aged 54 at the start of the First World War, believed that artistic skill was necessary for the design or construction of effective camouflage. He wrote that "the camoufleur is, of course, an artist, preferably one who paints or sculpts imaginative subjects. . . He must leave no clues for the detective on the other side in what he designs or executes, and he must above all things be resourceful. But his imagination and inventiveness should have free play".

Not all the camoufleurs were artists. John Graham Kerr and Hugh Cott were zoologists, though Cott was also a skilled illustrator. Both men believed passionately that effective disruptive camouflage was vital, especially in the face of aerial observation, but they had difficulty persuading authorities such as the British Air Ministry that their approach was the right one. At least one Royal Air Force officer felt that Cott's camouflage was highly effective, but, since it would demand the presence of a skilled artist for every installation, too costly to be practical.

First World War

Second World War

Post-war

References

Bibliography

 
 
 
 
 
 
 
 
 
 
 
 

Camoufleurs
20th-century artists
Lists of military personnel
Military camouflage